Simon-Michel Treuvé (1651–1730) was a French theologian.

1651 births
1730 deaths
17th-century French Catholic theologians